Paul Richard Thomas (born 1975) is a British Anglican bishop who has served as Bishop of Oswestry, a suffragan bishop in the Diocese of Lichfield and the provincial episcopal visitor for the western half of the Province of Canterbury (a post which was formerly exercised by the Bishop of Ebbsfleet) since February 2023. From 2011, he was vicar of St James's Church, Paddington.

Early life and education
Thomas was born in 1975 and raised in Carmarthenshire, Wales. He studied medieval English at Cardiff University, graduating with a Bachelor of Arts (BA) degree in 1996. He continued his studies and graduated with a Master of Arts (MA) degree in 1998 or 1999. He trained for ordained ministry at Ripon College Cuddesdon, a theological college near Oxford. He graduated with a further BA in 2001 and an MA in 2006.

Ordained ministry
Thomas was ordained in the Church of England as a deacon in 2002 and as a priest in 2003. From 2002 to 2006, he served his curacy in the Parish of St Mary with Christ Church, Wanstead in the Diocese of Chelmsford. He was an assistant priest at St Marylebone Parish Church from 2006, and then additionally a chaplain at St Marylebone School and chaplain to the Royal Academy of Music from 2008.

In 2011, Thomas was appointed vicar of St James's Church, Paddington. Having stepped down as school chaplain when he left Marylebone, he continued as chaplain to the Royal Academy of Music until 2012. He was additionally area dean of Westminster Paddington from 2016 to 2021, and acting Archdeacon of Charing Cross from 2017 to 2019. He was also a school chaplain at Wellington College, Berkshire, between 2018 and 2019.

Episcopal ministry
On 2 December 2022, it was announced that Thomas would be the next Bishop of Oswestry, a suffragan bishop in the Diocese of Lichfield. The Bishop of Oswestry is also the provincial episcopal visitor for traditionalist Anglo-Catholic parishes (i.e. those who reject the ordination of women as priests and bishops) in the thirteen dioceses of the western half of the Province of Canterbury. This role had formerly been undertaken by the Bishop of Ebbsfleet, and as such Thomas is the first PEV Bishop of Oswestry. He was consecrated a bishop on Candlemas (2 February) 2023 by Martin Warner, Bishop of Chichester, during a service in Canterbury Cathedral.

Selected works

References

Living people
Anglo-Catholic bishops
21st-century Anglican priests
Bishops of Oswestry
Welsh Christian clergy
Alumni of Cardiff University
Alumni of Ripon College Cuddesdon
University and college chaplains in the United Kingdom
Anglican chaplains
British chaplains
1975 births